Brian Welsh (born 23 February 1969) is a Scottish football coach and former player, who is currently owner and head coach of American club Northern Virginia United. He began his playing career with Dundee United, where he made 140 league appearances and was part of the team that won the 1994 Scottish Cup Final. He joined Hibernian in 1996, where he spent three years, before ending his career with brief spells at Stenhousemuir, Clydebank and Cowdenbeath. He also represented the Scotland under-19 team.

Welsh returned to Cowdenbeath as manager from 2006 to 2008 and later became Head of Youth Development at Livingston, where he was also briefly caretaker manager, before emigrating to the United States.

Playing career 

Welsh began his career with Dundee United, making his debut in the 1986–87 season. During that season, Welsh was part of the Scotland under-19 team who reached the semi-finals of the UEFA European Under-19 Football Championship, losing 1–0 to Italy. The following year, he reached the quarter-finals of the World Youth Championship, losing on penalties to West Germany. Welsh became a regular in the United side in 1993–94 and helped the club win the Scottish Cup for the first time, particularly by scoring in the semi-final against Aberdeen. He then experienced relegation in 1995 and subsequent promotion with the club. Welsh scored a crucial goal in a promotion play-off match against Partick Thistle in 1996.

In August 1996 Welsh left Dundee United to join Hibernian for a £200,000 transfer fee. Leaving Hibernian after three years, Welsh subsequently had spells with Stenhousemuir, Clydebank and finally Cowdenbeath, before retiring in 2002.

Welsh began legal proceedings against Malcolm Morrison, who was employed as Hibernian club doctor during his time with the club, in 2008. He claimed that an injection administered by Morrison had ruined his career, and an out-of-court settlement for a "substantial sum" was reached.

Coaching career 

After his playing retirement he helped coach the Cowdenbeath squad before being appointed team manager in October 2006, succeeding Mixu Paatelainen. Welsh was sacked by Cowdenbeath in June 2008, following their relegation to the Third Division. In 2009, Welsh won a compensation claim against Cowdenbeath for his dismissal as manager. The club stated that they had dismissed Welsh because he had incurred touchline bans due to misbehaviour during matches, but the judge ruled in his favour because the club had taken no action at the time and had dismissed him for unconnected reasons.

Welsh was appointed head of youth development by Livingston in July 2009.

He subsequently moved to the United States, where he became Technical Director for Braddock Road Elite Travel Soccer of the Braddock Road Youth Club in Fairfax, Virginia.  Currently, he has been appointed as the head coach for  Northern Virginia United since January 2018.

Career statistics

Honours 
Dundee United
 Scottish Cup
 1993–94

External links

References

1969 births
Clydebank F.C. (1965) players
Cowdenbeath F.C. managers
Cowdenbeath F.C. players
Dundee United F.C. players
Association football defenders
Hibernian F.C. players
Living people
Footballers from Edinburgh
Scottish Football League managers
Scottish Football League players
Scottish football managers
Scottish expatriate football managers
Scottish footballers
Stenhousemuir F.C. players
Livingston F.C. non-playing staff
Expatriate soccer managers in the United States